The Toyota P family is an overhead valve inline-four engine produced from October 1959 through 1994. Originally fitted to the Corona passenger car, it was soon relegated to commercial use vehicles and for its latter two decades it mostly powered various forklifts.

P

The  P was produced from 1959 through 1961.

 1959.10–1961.09 Toyota ToyoAce PK20,

2P
The  2P was produced from 1961 through 1972.

 1961.09–??? Toyota ToyoAce PK30/31, 
 1962–1964.08 Toyota Coronaline Van/Pickup PT26"
 1964.09–1967.05 Toyota Corona PT40/PT463P
The  3P was produced from 1967 through 1979.

 1967.05–1970.01 Toyota Corona PT41/PT47 1970.02–1973.07 Toyota Corona PT86V 1967–1971 Toyota ToyoAce PK32 1971–197? Toyota ToyoAce PY10 Toyota "Seven" shovel SG7'',

4P
The  4P (retaining the  bore but with a longer  stroke) mostly saw use in off-road equipment such as forklifts and loaders, where it was used until at least 1994 for the Toyota 5FGL. It produces  at 2400 rpm as fitted to the Toyota 2SGK6 loader (1993). In the 1972 2FG20 2-ton forklift it has  at 2800 rpm.

See also

 List of Toyota engines

References

P

Straight-four engines
Gasoline engines by model